Viu or VIU may refer to:

Universities 
Valencian International University, in Valencia, Spain
Vancouver Island University, in British Columbia, Canada
Venice International University, in Venice, Italy
Veritas International University, in Santa Ana, California, United States
Virginia International University, now Fairfax University of America, in Fairfax, Virginia, United States

Other uses 
Viù, a commune in Turin, Italy
Viu, Iran, a village
Viu (streaming media), over-the-top (OTT) video service from PCCW Media
ViuTV, Cantonese language channel in Hong Kong operated by HK Television Entertainment
Luis Viu (born 1943), Spanish alpine skier